Angustalius is a genus of moths of the family Crambidae.

Species
Angustalius besucheti (Bleszynski, 1963)
Angustalius casandra Bassi in Bassi & Trematerra, 2014
Angustalius ditaeniellus Marion, 1954
Angustalius malacelloides (Bleszynski, 1955)
Angustalius malacellus (Duponchel, 1836)
Angustalius philippiellus Viette, 1970

Former species
Angustalius hapaliscus (Zeller, 1852)

References

Crambinae
Crambidae genera